Harleston was  an American vessel launched in 1810 at Wiscasset, Maine, and taken in prize. Mestaer purchased her c.1813, and she became a West Indiaman until she was sold on Mestaer's death. She became a whaler and on her way home from her second whaling voyage was condemned in 1826 at Mauritius as unseaworthy and broken up.

Early British career
Harleston first appears in Lloyd's Register in 1813 with Ma__on, master, Mestaer, owner, and trade London transport. More legibly, in 1814 her master is Marion. 

In 1820 the executors of the estate of Peter Everitt Mestaer sold Harleston to Thomas Ward (or Wood), London.

Lloyd's Register for 1820 shows her master changing from W. Thornhill to Brightman, and her trade from London—Antigua to London—South Seas. However, it shows her owner changing from Ward & Co. to Mestaers.<ref name=LR1820>[https://hdl.handle.net/2027/mdp.39015005686830?urlappend=%3Bseq=241 Lloyd's Register (1820), Seq. №H103.]</ref>

WhalerHarleston sailed on her first whaling voyage in 1821 under the command of Isaac Brightman, and bound for Timor. She was reported to have been at Timor on 16 December with 200 barrels. in June-July 1824 she was off the coast of Japan with 500 barrels. In September she was again at Timor, but now with 700 barrels. In January 1825 she had 900 barrels.
	Lloyd's Register for 1825 shows Harlestons master as T. Gulliver, and her owner as Ward.

Fate
On 26 March 1826 Harleston put into Mauritius in an unseaworthy state while returning to London from Timor. The surveyors at Mauritius condemned her and she was then sold for breaking up. Her cargo of 200 tons of oil was transferred to Minerva'', Norris, master, for shipment to London.

Notes, citations, and references
Notes

Citations

References
 

1810 ships
Ships built in Wiscasset, Maine
Captured ships
Whaling ships
Age of Sail merchant ships
Merchant ships of the United Kingdom
Maritime incidents in March 1826